Collinsia sparsiflora is a flowering plant in the family Plantaginaceae known by the common names spinster's blue-eyed Mary and few-flowered collinsia. One variety of the species is native to the West Coast of the United States as far north as Washington, while the other three varieties are limited to California alone.

Varieties
  Collinsia sparsiflora var. arvensis
  Collinsia sparsiflora var. bruceae
  Collinsia sparsiflora var. collina
  Collinsia sparsiflora var. sparsiflora

Habitat
The plant grows in several types of habitat, including disturbed and cultivated areas. It has a weak affinity for serpentine soils, growing from sea-level to 5000'.

Botany
It is an annual herb producing a slender, reddish stem up to 30 centimeters tall with an inflorescence of widely spaced nodes bearing one to three flowers each. The flower has very long, pointed sepals and purple, lavender, or occasionally white flowers. The fruit is a spherical, red-spotted capsule growing deep within the long sepals.

Ecology
Colinsia sparsiflora has been found to host discrete populations of Acaulospora AM fungi (AMF (ecology)) on serpentine soil, Glomus on non-serpentine soil types.

References

External links
Jepson Manual Treatment of Collinsia sparsiflora
Collinsia sparsiflora — U.C. Photo gallery

sparsiflora
Flora of California
Flora of Oregon
Flora of Washington (state)
Flora of the Cascade Range
Flora of the Klamath Mountains
Flora of the Sierra Nevada (United States)
Natural history of the California chaparral and woodlands
Natural history of the California Coast Ranges
Natural history of the Central Valley (California)
Natural history of the San Francisco Bay Area
Flora of the West Coast of the United States
Plants described in 1836
Flora without expected TNC conservation status